Céline R. Gounder (born April 22, 1977) is an American physician and medical journalist who specializes in infectious diseases and global health. She was a member of the COVID-19 Advisory Board transition team of then-incoming U.S. president Joe Biden. In 2022, she joined the Kaiser Family Foundation as senior fellow and editor-at-large for public health at Kaiser Health News.

Early life 
Céline R. Gounder was born in the U.S. on April 22, 1977, the daughter of a French mother, Nicole Pantanelli, from Normandy and Raj Natarajan Gounder, a Tamil-Indian father from Perumpalayam near Erode. At age 16, she began attending Princeton University, and graduated in 1997 with a Bachelor of Arts degree in molecular biology. In 2000, she received a Master of Science degree in epidemiology from Johns Hopkins Bloomberg School of Public Health with her thesis "Field evaluation of a rapid immunochromatographic test for tuberculosis". At the University of Washington School of Medicine, she earned a Doctor of Medicine degree in 2004. While in medical school, she co-founded the International Health Group, which advocates for doctors training to serve disadvantaged people around the world. She completed her residency in internal medicine at Massachusetts General Hospital.

Career
Gounder's first position was as a post-doctoral fellow at Johns Hopkins Bloomberg School of Public Health, where she researched TB and HIV in sub-Saharan Africa and served as Director for Delivery in the Consortium to Respond Effectively to the AIDS/TB Epidemic, which was funded by the Gates Foundation. She then joined the New York City Department of Health and Mental Hygiene working on control of TB in the city.

Starting in 2018, Gounder practiced medicine part-time while addressing her long time concerns with health issues as a medical journalist. She was on the editorial advisory board of TEDMED and has published articles about infectious disease and other medical topics in media including The New Yorker and The Atlantic, and has appeared on TV news and talk shows.  

In 2017, Gounder founded Just Human Productions, a non-profit media organization that uses storytelling in an effort to impact public health. Gounder produced the podcast American Diagnosis, focusing on diverse health topics. With the rise of COVID-19, she created the podcast Epidemic, which she cohosted with Biden-advisor Ron Klain. 

On November 9, 2020, Gounder was named as a member of the COVID-19 Advisory Board of U.S. president-elect Joe Biden.

As of 2021, Gounder is also an assistant professor at the NYU medical school.

Recognition 
While pursuing her master's degree at Johns Hopkins, Gounder was inducted into the Delta Omega Public Health Honor Society in 2000.  In 2004 when she graduated from University of Washington School of Medicine, she was awarded the James W. Haviland Award for "outstanding clinical competence and for unusual promise as a leader of medicine in the future". In 2010, she was awarded the W. Leight Thompson, MD Excellence in Research Award at Johns Hopkins. Also that year, she was the recipient of the Arthur M. Dannenberg, Jr. Award at Johns Hopkins, and was an Ashoka Changemaker Finalist.

In 2016, Gounder was elected a fellow for the Infectious Diseases Society of America.

In 2017, Gounder was listed in People Magazine'''s 25 Women Changing the World'' in 2017 for her contributions to health care.

Personal life 
Gounder was married to sports journalist Grant Wahl from 2001 until his sudden death in 2022. They lived with their two dogs in New York City.

References

External links
 
 

21st-century American women writers
21st-century American non-fiction writers
21st-century American women physicians
21st-century American physicians
Johns Hopkins Bloomberg School of Public Health alumni
Living people
Place of birth missing (living people)
Princeton University alumni
University of Washington School of Medicine alumni
Women science writers
Fellows of the Infectious Diseases Society of America
American people of French descent
American people of Indian Tamil descent
American women writers of Indian descent
1977 births
American women non-fiction writers
American science writers
American physicians of Indian descent